STMicroelectronics N.V. commonly referred as ST or STMicro is a Dutch multinational corporation and technology company of French-Italian origin headquartered in Plan-les-Ouates near Geneva, Switzerland and listed on the French stock market. ST is the largest European semiconductor contract manufacturing and design company. The company resulted from the merger of two government-owned semiconductor companies in 1987: Thomson Semiconducteurs of France and SGS Microelettronica of Italy.

History 
ST was formed in 1987 by the merger of two government-owned semiconductor companies: Italian SGS Microelettronica (where SGS stands for Società Generale Semiconduttori, "Semiconductors' General Company"), and French Thomson Semiconducteurs, the semiconductor arm of Thomson.

SGS Microelettronica originated in 1972 from a previous merger of two companies:
 ATES (Aquila Tubi e Semiconduttori), a vacuum tube and semiconductor maker headquartered in L'Aquila, the regional capital of the region of Abruzzo in Southern Italy, which in 1961 changed its name to Azienda Tecnica ed Elettronica del Sud and relocated its manufacturing plant in the Industrial Zone of Catania, in Sicily;
 Società Generale Semiconduttori (founded in 1957 by Jewish-Italian engineer, politician, and industrialist Adriano Olivetti).

Thomson Semiconducteurs was created in 1982 by the French government's widespread nationalization of industries following the election of socialist François Mitterrand to the presidency. It included:
 the semiconductor activities of the French electronics company Thomson;
 in 1985 it bought Mostek, a US company founded in 1969 as a spin-off of Texas Instruments, from United Technologies;
 Silec, founded in 1977;
 Eurotechnique, founded in 1979 in Rousset, Bouches-du-Rhône as a joint-venture between Saint-Gobain of France and US-based National Semiconductor;
 EFCIS, founded in 1977;
 SESCOSEM, founded in 1969.

At the time of the merger of these two companies in 1987, the new corporation was named SGS-THOMSON but took its current name of STMicroelectronics in May 1998 following Thomson's sale of its shares. After its creation ST was ranked 14th among the top 20 semiconductor suppliers with sales of around US$850 million. The company has participated in the consolidation of the semiconductor industry since its formation, with acquisitions including:
 
 In 1989, British company Inmos known for its transputer microprocessors from parent Thorn EMI;
 In 1994, Canada-based Nortel's semiconductor activities;
 In 1999, UK, Edinburgh based VLSI-Vision CMOS Image Sensor research & development company, a spin-out of Edinburgh University.  Incorporated in 1 January 2000, the company became STMicroelectronics Imaging Division, currently part of the Analog MEMS and Sensors business group;
 In 2000, WaferScale Integration Inc. (WSI, Fremont, California), a vendor of EPROM and flash memory-based programmable system-chips;
 In 2002, Alcatel's Microelectronics division, which along with the incorporation of smaller ventures such as UK company, Synad Ltd, helped the company expand into the Wireless-LAN market;
 In 2007, US-based Genesis Microchip. Genesis Microchip is known for their strength in video processing technology (Faroudja) and has design centres located in Santa Clara, California, Toronto, Taipei City and Bangalore.

 
On December 8, 1994, the company completed its initial public offering on the Paris and New York stock exchanges. Owner Thomson SA sold its stake in the company in 1998 when the company also listed on the Italian Bourse in Milan. In 2002, Motorola and TSMC joined ST and Philips in a new technology partnership. The Crolles 2 Alliance was created with a new 12" wafer manufacturing facility located in Crolles, France. By 2005, ST was ranked fifth, behind Intel, Samsung, Texas Instruments and Toshiba, but ahead of Infineon, Renesas, NEC, NXP Semiconductors, and Freescale. The company was the largest European semiconductors supplier, ahead of Infineon and NXP.

Early in 2007, NXP Semiconductors (formerly Philips Semiconductors) and Freescale (formerly Motorola Semiconductors) decided to stop their participation in Crolles 2 Alliance. Under the terms of the agreement the Alliance came to an end on December 31, 2007. On May 22, 2007, ST and Intel created a joint venture in the memory application called Numonyx: this new company merged ST and Intel Flash Memory activities. Semiconductor market consolidation continued with ST and NXP announcing on April 10, 2008, the creation of a new joint venture of their mobile activities, with ST owning 80% of the new company and NXP 20%. This joint venture began on August 20, 2008. On February 10, 2009, ST Ericsson, a joint venture bringing together ST-NXP Wireless and Ericsson Mobile Platforms, was established.

ST Ericsson was a multinational manufacturer of wireless products and semiconductors, supplying to mobile device manufacturers. ST-Ericsson was a 50/50 joint venture of STMicroelectronics and Ericsson established on February 3, 2009, and dissolved on August 2, 2013.

Headquartered in Geneva, Switzerland, it was a fabless company, outsourcing semiconductor manufacturing to foundry companies. In 2011, ST announced the creation of a joint lab with Sant'Anna School of Advanced Studies. The lab will focus on research and innovation in bio-robotics, smart systems and microelectronics. Past collaborations with Sant'Anna School of Advanced Studies included DustBot, a platform that integrated self-navigating "service robots" for waste collection.

Shareholders 
As of December 31, 2014, the shareholders were:
 68.4% public (New York Stock Exchange, Euronext Paris, Borsa Italiana Milano);
 4.1% treasury shares;
 27.6% STMicroelectronics Holding B.V.:
 50% FT1CI (Bpifrance 79.2% and French Alternative Energies and Atomic Energy Commission (CEA) 20.8%; previously );
 50% Ministry of Economy and Finance of Italy .

Manufacturing facilities
Unlike fabless semiconductor companies, STMicroelectronics owns and operates its own semiconductor wafer fabs. The company owned five 8 inch (200 mm) wafer fabs and one 12 inch (300 mm) wafer fab in 2006. Most of the production is scaled at 0.18 µm, 0.13 µm, 90 nm and 65 nm (measurements of transistor gate length). STMicroelectronics also owns back-end plants, where silicon dies are assembled and bonded into plastic or ceramic packages.

Major sites include:

Grenoble, France
Grenoble is one of the company's most important R&D centres, employing around 4,000 staff. The Polygone site employs 2,200 staff and is one of the historical bases of the company (ex SGS). All the historical wafer fab lines are now closed but the site hosts the headquarters of many divisions (marketing, design, industrialization) and an important R&D center, focused on silicon and software design and fab process development.

The  fab, known as Crolles 1, is the company's first and was built as part of a 1991 partnership between SGS-Thomson and Philips to develop new manufacturing technologies. Crolles 1 was opened on September 9, 1993 by Gérard Longuet, French minister for industry, and Alain Carignon, mayor of Grenoble.

The  fab was inaugurated by French president Jacques Chirac, on February 27, 2003. It includes a R&D center which focuses on developing new nanometric technology processes for 90 nm to 32 nm scale using  wafers and it was developed for The Crolles 2 Alliance. This alliance of STMicroelectronics, TSMC, NXP Semiconductors (formerly Philips semiconductor) and Freescale (formerly Motorola semiconductor) partnered in 2002 to develop the facility and to work together on process development. The technologies developed at the facility were also used by global semiconductor foundry TSMC of Taiwan, allowing TSMC to build the products developed in Crolles on behalf of the Alliance partners who required such foundry capacity.
A new fab is under construction since 2015.

Rousset, France
Employing around 3,000 staff, Rousset hosts several division headquarters including smartcards, microcontrollers, and EEPROM as well as several R&D centers. Rousset also hosts an 8-inch (200 mm) fab, which was opened on May 15, 2000 by French prime minister Lionel Jospin.

The site opened in 1979 as a  fab operated by Eurotechnique, a joint venture between Saint-Gobain of France and National Semiconductor of the US. Rousset was sold to Thomson-CSF in 1982 as part of the French government's 1981–82 nationalization of several industries. As part of the nationalisation, a former Thomson plant in the center of Aix-en-Provence operating since the 1960s was closed and staff were transferred to the new Rousset site. The original  fab was upgraded into  and later  fab in 1996. It is now being shut down.

In 1988, a small group of employees from the Thomson Rousset plant (including the director, Marc Lassus) founded a start-up company, Gemalto (formerly known as Gemplus), which became a leader in the smartcard industry.

Tours, France
Employing 1,500 staff, this site hosts a fab and R&D centers.

Milan, Italy
Employing 6,000 staff, the Milan facilities match Grenoble in importance. Agrate Brianza employs around 4,000 staff and is a historical base of the company (ex SGS). The site has several fab lines (including a  fab) and an R&D center. Castelletto, employs 300 to 400 staff and hosts some divisions and R&D centers.

Update-2012:
Numonyx JV (with Intel) is acquired by Micron.
As such, R2 Fab (Agrate previous R&D 200mm Fab) is currently a Micron entity

Catania, Italy 
The Catania plant in Sicily employs 5,000 staff and hosts several R&D centers and divisions, focusing on flash memory technologies as well as two fabs. The plant was launched in 1961 by ATES to supply under licensing to RCA of the US and initially using germanium. The site's two major wafer fabs are a  fab, opened in April 1997 by then-Italian Prime Minister Romano Prodi, and a  fab that has never been completed and which was transferred in its current state to "Numonyx" in 2008. A new manufacturing facility for SiliconCarbide (SiC) substrates of 150 mm should open here in 2023.

Caserta, Italy
STmicro eSIM and SIM production facility for embedded form factor eSIM.

Kirkop, Malta
As of 2010, ST employed some 1,500 people in Kirkop, making it the largest private sector employer, and the country's leading exporter.

Singapore
In 1970, SGS created its first assembly back-end plant in Singapore, in the area of Toa Payoh. Then in 1981, SGS decided to build a wafer
fab in Singapore. The Singapore technical engineers have been trained in Italy and the fab of Ang Mo Kio started to produce its first
wafers in 1984. Converted up to  fab, this is now an important  wafer fab of the group. Ang Mo Kio also hosts some design centers. The site currently employs 6000 staff.

Update-2012: Numonyx JV (with Intel) is acquired by Micron in 2010. As such, AMK8 Fab (200mm HVM Fab) is currently a Micron entity. AMK5 and AMK6 remains to be STM entities.
Update-2019: AMK8 has been reacquired by STM from Micron.

Tunis, Tunisia
Application, design and support. about 110 employees. Divisions: MCD

Bouskoura, Morocco
Founded in 1979 as a radiofrequency products facility, the Bouskoura site now hosts back-end manufacturing activity, which includes chip testing and packaging.

Other sites

Administrative headquarters
 Geneva, Switzerland: Corporate headquarter which hosts most of the ST top management. It totals some hundred of employees.
 Saint-Genis-Pouilly, France, near Geneva: A few hundred of employees. Headquarters for logistics.
 Paris: Marketing and support.

Regional headquarters
 Coppell, Texas: US headquarters.
 Singapore: Headquarters for the Asia-Pacific region.
 Tokyo: Headquarters for Japan and Korea operations.
 Shanghai: Headquarters for China operations.

Assembly plants
 Malta: In 1981, SGS-Thomson (now STMicroelectronics) built its first assembly plant in Malta. STMicroelectronics is, as of 2008, the largest private employer on the island, employing around 1,800 people.
 Muar, Malaysia: around 4000 employees. This site was built in 1974 by Thomson and is now an assembly plant.
 Shenzhen, Guangdong province, China, near Hong Kong: In 1994, ST and the Shenzhen Electronics Group signed a partnership to construct and jointly operate an assembly plant (ST has majority with 60%). The plant is located in Futian Free Trade Zone and became operational in 1996. It has around 3,300 employees. A new assembly plant is built in Longgang since 2008, and closed up till 2014. The R&D, design, sales and marketing office is located in the Hi-tech industrial park in Nanshan district.
 Calamba in the province of Laguna, Philippines: In 2008, ST acquired this plant from NXP Semiconductors. Initially as part of joint venture with NXP but later acquired the whole share turning it into a full-fledged STMicroelectronics Assembly and Testing plant. Currently it employs 2,000 employees.

Design centers
 Cairo, Egypt: Hardware and software design center, started in 2020, with 50 employees.
 Rabat, Morocco: A design center that employs 160 people.
 Naples, Italy: A Design center employing 300 people.
 Lecce, Italy: HW & SW Design Center which hosts 20 researchers in the Advanced System Technology group.
 Ang Mo Kio, Singapore: In 1970, SGS created its first assembly back-end plant in Singapore, in the area of Toa Payoh.  Then in 1981, SGS decided to build a wafer fab in Singapore.  The Singapore technical engineers have been trained in Italy and the fab of Ang Mo Kio started to produce its first wafers in 1984.  Converted up to 8 inch (200 mm) fab, this is now an important 8 inch (200 mm) wafer fab of the ST group. Ang Mo Kio also hosts design centers for various groups.
 Greater Noida, India: The Noida site was launched in 1992 to conduct software engineering activities. A silicon design center was inaugurated on February 14, 1995.  With 120 employees, it was the largest design center of the company outside Europe at the time. In 2006, the site was shifted to Greater Noida for further expansion. The site hosts mainly design teams. It is now primarily involved with the design of home video products (Set-Top Box, DVD), GPS and Wireless LAN chips, and accompanying software. Worldwide Data center support is also transferred to Greater Noida in 2004. The employee strength in Greater Noida is around 2000. This also includes employees of ST-Ericsson.
 Santa Clara, California, (Silicon Valley), United States: 120 staff in marketing, design and applications.
 La Jolla, California, (San Diego, United States): 80 staff in design and applications.
 Lancaster, Pennsylvania, U.S.: Application, support, and marketing.
 Prague, Czech Republic: 100 to 200 employees. Application, design and support.
 Tunis, Tunisia: 110 employees. Application, design and support.
 Sophia Antipolis, near Nice, France: Design center with a few hundred employees.
 Edinburgh, Scotland: 200 staff focused in the field of imaging and photon detection.
 Ottawa, Ontario, Canada: In 1993, SGS-Thomson purchased the semiconductor activities of Nortel which owned in Ottawa an R&D center and a fab. The fab was closed in 2000, however, a design, R&D centre and sales office is operating in the city.
 Toronto, Ontario, Canada: HW & SW Design Center primarily involved with the design of video processor ICs as part of ST's TVM Division.
 Bangalore, India: HW and SW design center employing more than 250 people (Including the employees of ST Ericsson and Genesis Microchip).
 Zaventem, Belgium: 100 employees. Design & Application Center. Closed in 2013
 Helsinki, Finland: Design Center.
 Turku, Finland: Design Center.
 Oulu, Finland: Design Center.
 Tampere, Finland: Design Center.
 Longmont, Colorado USA: Design Center.
 Graz, Austria: NFC Competence Center.

Closing sites
The Phoenix, Arizona 8 inch (200 mm) fab, the Carrollton, Texas 6 inch (150 mm) fab, and the Ain Sebaa, Morocco fab are beginning rampdown plans, and are destined to close by 2010.

The Casablanca, Morocco site consists of two assembly parts (Bouskoura and Aïn Sebaâ) and totals around 4000 employees. It was opened in the 1960s by Thomson.

The Bristol, United Kingdom site employing well over 300 at its peak (in 2001/2) but was ramped down to approx. 150 employees at close by early 2014.

The Ottawa, Ontario, Canada plant (approx. 450 employees) will close down by 2013 end.

Closed sites
 Rennes, France hosted a 6-inch (150 mm) fab and was closed in 2004
 Rancho Bernardo, California, a 4-inch (100 mm) fab created by Nortel and purchased by SGS-Thomson in 1994, after which it was converted into a 6-inch (150 mm) fab in 1996.
 SGS's first presence in the US was a sales office based in Phoenix in the early 1980s. Later, under SGS-Thomson, an 8-inch (200 mm) fab was completed in Phoenix in 1995. The company's second 8" fab after Crolles 1, the site was first dedicated to producing microprocessors for Cyrix.  On July 10, 2007, ST said that it would close this site, and in July 2010 the shell of the Phoenix PF1 FAB was bought by Western Digital Corporation.
 The Carrollton, Texas site was built in 1969 by Mostek, an American company founded by former employees of Texas Instruments. In 1979, Mostek was acquired by United Technologies, which sold it to Thomson Semiconducteurs in 1985. Initially equipped with a 4-inch (100 mm) fab, it was converted into a 6-inch (150 mm) fab in 1988. The Colorado Springs activities of British company INMOS were transferred to Carrollton in 1989 following its acquisition by SGS Thomson. Since then the site has been refocused to wafer testing. On July 10, 2007, ST announced it would close this fab, and it was finally closed in 2010.
 Bristol, UK This R&D site housed the British company Inmos, which in 1978 began development of the famous Transputer microprocessor.  The site was acquired with Inmos in 1989, and was primarily involved with the design of home video and entertainment products (e.g. Set-Top Box), GPS chips, and accompanying software. At its peak the site employed more than 250 employees. The site officially closed on March 31, 2014.

Future locations
 On August 8, 2007, ST bought Nokia's microchip development team and plans to invest heavily in development of cellular ASIC applications. The purchase included Nokia's ASIC team in Southwood (UK) and the company plans several sites in Finland.

See also

Altitude SEE Test European Platform (ASTEP)
 Interuniversity Microelectronics Centre (IMEC)
 Numonyx
 ST-Ericsson
List of semiconductor fabrication plants
 STM8
 STM32
 STMicroelectronics Small Shareholders' Group (STM.S.S.G.)
  Collectif Autonome et Démocratique de STMicroelectronics (CAD-ST)

References

External links

Electronics companies established in 1987
Companies listed on Euronext Paris
Semiconductor companies of Switzerland
Electronics companies of France
Electronics companies of Italy
Government-owned companies of Italy
Manufacturing companies based in Geneva
Partly privatized companies of Italy
Photovoltaics manufacturers
Government-owned companies of France
Multinational companies headquartered in Switzerland
CAC 40